The Sumo Museum (相撲博物館, sumō hakubutsukan) is an institution located in the Ryōgoku Kokugikan arena in Sumida, Tokyo. The museum is managed by the Japan Sumo Association.

The museum was opened in September 1954 when the Kuramae Kokugikan was completed. Its collection were based on materials collected over many years by Tadamasa Sakai, a well known sumo fan and first director of the museum. Its missions are to prevent the loss of materials related to sumo by collecting them and displaying them in the premises of the museum. In January 1985, when the Ryōgoku Kokugikan opened, it moved to its present location.

History
Since then, thanks to donation from individuals and institutionalized collection, the Museum gathered around 30 000 pieces, half of them still being inherited from Sakai's collection. When the association was established in 1925, the act of endowment stipulated that the Association had to maintain a library to register records as one of its activities. When the Association became a Public Interest Incorporated Foundation, the maintenance of a museum was stipulated in the statutes of the Association. During the same year, 2014, the Museum celebrated its 60 years of existence by organizing a special exhibition.

The museum collects materials related to sumo (such as woodblock prints, banzuke and kesho-mawashi) and display them to the public. It also functions as a research center to study and examine the history of sumo and holds public conferences (called "Master talk event") where former wrestlers reflects on their career and answer questions from fans. Curators also publish a bulletin called the Sumo Museum Bulletin (相撲博物館紀要) since 2002, to publish the results of their researchs. The museum is a small institution (150 m2), with only one exhibition room and 3 curators to provide visits and organization. Due to the lack of space, the exhibitions are not permanent and change every 2 months.

Admission is free, but since it is attached to the Kokugikan, only those who have an admission ticket for the Kokugikan can enter when there is a tournament or a paid event in the arena. However, anyone can enter freely on all other opening days. There are two entrances, one at the front gate of the Kokugikan on the second floor of the building, and another one on the side way of the arena. Guided tours are sometimes held during the exhibition period.

In January 2020, the Sumo Museum closed its door in the process of a renovation plan and in prevision of the 35th anniversary of the Ryōgoku Kokugikan.

Past exhibitions
Exhibitions are displayed alternately six times a year, with different themes changing each time. The exhibition schedule is typically changed everytime a yokozuna retire, so an exhibition dedicated to the wrestler could take place. Between 2003 and 2022, 109 exhibitions took place in the museum.

Sumo Museum directors

Sumo Museum gallery

See also
Professional sumo
Japan Sumo Association
List of museums in Tokyo

External links
List of Sumo Museum past exhibits

References

Museums in Tokyo
History museums in Japan
Museums established in 1954
Sports museums in Japan
Sumo venues in Japan